Nicolas Senzemba (born 25 March 1996) is a French professional footballer who most recently played as a left-back for Rumilly Vallières.

Club career
Nicolas Senzemba is a youth exponent from FC Sochaux-Montbéliard. In 2015, he won the Coupe Gambardella with the club.

He made his league cup debut on 12 August 2014 against Stade Lavallois. and his Ligue 2 debut on 3 October 2014 against AJ Auxerre.

In the summer of 2018, Senzemba was sent on loan to Croatian side NK Istra 1961. After featuring in three matches in the Prva HNL the loan was terminated and he was loaned to Championnat National side US Concarneau at the beginning of October 2018. However, he had to wait until January 2019 for eligibility and made his debut for Concarneau on 18 January against Drancy.

In June 2020, after being released by Sochaux, Senzemba joined Championnat National 2 side CS Sedan Ardennes.

International career
Senzemba has represented France internationally at U16, U17, and U19 levels.

Honours
 Coupe Gambardella: 2015

References

External links
 
 

1996 births
Living people
People from Champigny-sur-Marne
Footballers from Val-de-Marne
French footballers
Association football fullbacks
France youth international footballers
Ligue 2 players
Championnat National players
Championnat National 2 players
Championnat National 3 players
Croatian Football League players
FC Sochaux-Montbéliard players
Pau FC players
NK Istra 1961 players
US Concarneau players
CS Sedan Ardennes players
Le Touquet AC players
GFA Rumilly-Vallières players
French expatriate footballers
French expatriate sportspeople in Croatia
Expatriate footballers in Croatia